Itararé ("indian word for excavated stone") is a bairro in the District of Sede in the municipality of Santa Maria, in the Brazilian state of Rio Grande do Sul. It is located in northeast Santa Maria.

Villages 
The bairro contains the following villages: Canário, Itararé, Loteamento Link, Possadas, Vila Bela Vista, Vila Bürger, Vila Felipe Menna Barreto, Vila Kruel, Vila Montanha Russa, Vila Nossa Senhora Aparecida, Vila Pércio Reis, Vila Popular Leste, Vila Popular Oeste.

Gallery of photos

References 

Bairros of Santa Maria, Rio Grande do Sul